Glen is an unincorporated community in Sioux County, Nebraska, United States. It was named for the surrounding glen.

History
A post office was established at Glen in 1887, and remained in operation until 1953. There are still a few residents.

References

Unincorporated communities in Sioux County, Nebraska
Unincorporated communities in Nebraska